Bura or Bowra, in Iran, may refer to:
 Bala Bowra, Upper Bowra
 Mian Bura, Middle Bura